The 2014 1. deild was the 71st season of 1. deild.

Tvøroyrar Bóltfelag and FC Suðuroy got promoted to the Faroe Islands Premier League, after finishing 1st and 2nd at the end of the season.

Havnar Bóltfelag II and EB/Streymur II got relegated to 2. deild, after finishing 9th and 10th at the end of the season.

Teams

A total of 10 teams participated in the 2014 edition of 1. deild.

Team changes

Stadiums and locations

League table

Results

Matches 1-18

Matches 19-27

Top goalscorers

See also
2014 Faroe Islands Premier League
2014 Faroe Islands Cup

1. deild seasons
2
Faroe
Faroe